Santa Isabel de Siguas District is one of twenty-nine districts of the province Arequipa in Peru.

References

Districts of the Arequipa Province
Districts of the Arequipa Region